Kampong Katimahar is a village in Brunei-Muara District, Brunei, about  from the capital Bandar Seri Begawan. The population was 873 in 2016. It is one of the villages within Mukim Sengkurong. The postcode is BG2721.

Facilities 
Awang Haji Mohd Yusof Primary School is the village primary school, whereas Katimahar Religious School is the village school for the country's Islamic religious primary education.

Paduka Seri Begawan Sultan Omar Ali Saifuddien Mosque is the village mosque.

References 

Katimahar